The Last Reserves (German: Das letzte Aufgebot) is a 1953 Austrian historical drama film directed by Alfred Lehner and starring Marianne Schönauer, Kurt Heintel and Eduard Köck. In West Germany it was released under the alternative title Der Bauernrebell.

The film's sets were designed by the art director Gustav Abel. It was shot at Ringfilm's Studios in Vienna and on location in Tyrol.

Cast

References

Bibliography 
 Fritsche, Maria. Homemade Men in Postwar Austrian Cinema: Nationhood, Genre and Masculinity. Berghahn Books, 2013.

External links 
 

1953 films
1950s historical drama films
Austrian historical drama films
1950s German-language films
Films directed by Alfred Lehner
Films set in the Alps
Napoleonic Wars films
1953 drama films
Austrian black-and-white films